"Move Your Ass!" is a song by German band Scooter, released in January 1995 as the second single from their first studio album, ...and the Beat Goes On! (1995). In October of the same year, a Move Your Ass EP was marketed in United Kingdom and Ireland. This rave song was a hit in countries such as Austria, the Netherlands, Germany, Norway, Sweden and Switzerland where it reached the top ten. In France, the song reached #11.

“Move Your Ass” was the introduction to Scooter in the UK, being the first of their many releases to enter the UK top 40.

Originally it was released on the 1st of April 1995, but it stalled at a lowly number 98 in the chart. The following week it was out of the UK top 100 altogether.

“Move Your Ass” saw a UK re-release on the 21st of October 1995 where it entered the UK top 40 chart (and peaked) at number 23. The following week the single slipped two places to number 25, before starting a slippery decline (35), tumbling twenty places to its lowest position of number 55. It remained in the UK top 100 for four weeks only and dipped out of the 100 altogether the following week.

Critical reception
James Masterton for Dotmusic viewed "Move Your Ass!" as a "startlingly retrospective-sounding acid track". Pan-European magazine Music & Media commented, "Vrrrrrroooooommmmmmmm!!!!! There goes the Vespa again to deliver the follow-up to novelty hit Hyper Hyper. Once more the unchanged winning team performs in a fake live show setting." James Hamilton from Music Week'''s RM Dance Update described it as a "rabble rousing phonetic exhortations shouted surging fantastically frantic 0-160 3-0bpm raver from Germany".

Music video
A music video was produced to promote the single, directed by Eric Will. It was later published on YouTube in February 2009. The video has amassed more than 8,5 million views as of September 2021.

Track listings

Charts

Weekly charts

 *: In Scotland and the UK, this song was part of the Move Your Ass'' EP.

Year-end charts

Certifications

References

Songs about dancing
1995 singles
German electronic songs
Scooter (band) songs
Songs written by H.P. Baxxter
Songs written by Rick J. Jordan
Songs written by Jens Thele
Music videos directed by Eric Will
English-language German songs